Brian Hooks (born July 27, 1974) is an American actor, comedian, producer and director. He is best known for his roles as protagonist Rob Douglas in the screwball comedy 3 Strikes, and Nick Delaney on the UPN television sitcom Eve.

Acting career
Brian’s first acting role occurred as the central character in the film Phat Beach (1996), which was written and directed by Doug Ellin (creator of HBO’s Entourage).  The success of Phat Beach led to roles in other films, including High School High (1996), Bulworth (1998), Beloved (1998) and Austin Powers: The Spy Who Shagged Me (1999).  At the same time, he had guest starring roles in many television series in the late 1990s, such as Cracker, NYPD Blue, Moesha, ER and The Parkers.

In 2000, Hooks appeared as the central character in the comedy film 3 Strikes After that, he continued to star in, as well as executive produce, many low-budget straight-to-DVD films, including Nothin’ 2 Lose (2000), The Luau (2001), The Chatroom (2002) and Malibooty (2003).

In the following years, he began to redirect some of his efforts to the off-camera aspects of production.  After developing and producing a low-budget film which produced a remarkable five-thousand percent return (5000%) on investment, Q: The Movie, Brian was first able to observe the distinct advantages, and lucrative nature, of successfully creating and developing motion pictures.  As a result, and backed by major film distributors such as MGM, Brian began to produce low-budget independent films in between his acting roles.

Brian’s procession of straight-to-DVD films led to him once being called “The King of DVD” by the urban media. In 2007, he produced, co-directed and co-wrote (with Deon Taylor) and starred in the horror film Dead Tone (originally titled 7eventy5ive). He produced the film I Do… I Did (2009). Hooks was the co-host of the relationship show According To Him & Her, which aired on Centric.

In 2021, amid the COVID-19 pandemic, Brian launched his own production company called Left of Bang Entertainment. Aside from producing in-house films, Left of Bang Entertainment will provide free educational programs and mentorship opportunities for inner-city kids.

Filmography

Film

Television

References

External links

1973 births
Living people
African-American male actors
American male film actors
American male television actors
Male actors from California
Male actors from Bakersfield, California
21st-century African-American people
20th-century African-American people